Ashfaque Sayed (born 17 October 1964) is an Indian professional darts player who played in Professional Darts Corporation (PDC) events.

Darts career
Ashfaque Sayed's first major tournament came in the 2005 WDF World Cup, against Brazilian Artur Valle. He then played in the 2006 WDF Asia-Pacific Cup. Sayed won the 2007 India National Championships 4 times till 2007 by this virtue Was ranked no 1 in Indian order of Merit to Qualify for the 2008 PDC World Darts Championship   , losing in the preliminary round 5–0 to China's Shi Yongsheng.He qualified as India no 1 on inclusion of  India as a wild card Entry along with 3 other countries . Ashfaque became the first Indian to represent India at the PDC world cup 

Ashfaque Sayed also represented India at the 2015 PDC World Cup of Darts in Frankfurt Germany , partnering Nitin Kumar. They were eliminated by Germany in the first round, losing 5–0.

Ashfaque Sayed last played the PDC in July 2015@ Frankfurt Germany.

World Championship Results

PDC
 2008: Last 68: (lost to Shi Yongsheng 0–5) (legs)

External links
Profile and stats on Darts Database

Indian darts players
Living people
1964 births
Professional Darts Corporation associate players
Sportspeople from Maharashtra
PDC World Cup of Darts Indian team